is a paid mobile game developed by Taito and published by Taito in Japan and Square Enix worldwide. As the name suggests, it is a crossover between Arkanoid and Space Invaders and has gameplay elements adapted from both games. The game was released without any prior announcement by Square Enix internationally on May 17, 2017. It got re-released on Nintendo Switch and PlayStation 4 as part of Space Invaders Invincible Collection and Space Invaders Forever.

Gameplay
The game includes elements borrowed from Space Invaders and Arkanoid. The player maneuvers the Vaus spacecraft along the blue region located at the bottom of the screen, and must deflect a ball at a formation of bricks and Space Invaders aliens. The player will need to avoid fire from the enemy aliens, although the player can deflect the shots at them. The goal of each stage is to destroy the formation of bricks as well as the aliens, and the player moves forward to the next stage once this goal has been completed. The player travels through several different worlds, with each world containing four stages. At the final stage, the player must defeat a final boss before moving on. Once a world has been completed, the player will acquire a random power-up in the form of characters representing older Taito properties, such as Bubble Bobble, Darius and Psychic Force.

Taito characters

Reception

Arkanoid vs. Space Invaders received positive reviews from critics, with reviews praising the amalgamation of Arkanoid and Space Invaders, and ditching the free-to-play model of mobile applications. The game currently has an 85/100 score on Metacritic. Eli Hodapp of TouchArcade states that "the Arkanoid and Space Invaders universes have been duct taped together in a way that actually works quite well" and that it is "a super-solid brick breaker with an interesting twist and no freemium shenanigans". Chris Shilling of Waypoint describes the game as "Crisp and colorful with an energetic EDM soundtrack, Arkanoid vs. Space Invaders is a fizzy, addictive treat—like a bag of cola bottles but with slightly more nutritional value, and all for roughly the price of a London pint". Jennifer Allen of Gamezebo commented by saying that "Arkanoid and Space Invaders is one of those perfectly shrewd moves that you had no idea could work so well until, well, it did. Partly skills based and partly a puzzle game, it's a delightful combination of two iconic classics. Even better, you won't have to suffer the scourge of in-app purchases to enjoy it". However, she did criticise the boss battles by stating that they "are somewhat lackluster, never quite fulfilling their potential". Harry Slater of Pocket Gamer described Arkanoid vs. Space Invaders as "a mash up of two of Taito's old arcade franchises. And it's actually pretty interesting. There's bouncing, there are blocks, there are waves of alien invaders trying to destroy the cosmos. While that might sound like a silly mish mash, there's actually a decent amount of cohesion here". CJ Andrissen of Destructoid praised the game by stating that it is "one of the best mobile games of the year" and that "there is just so much game here to enjoy and with no ads, no microtransactions, and no need to always be connected to the internet, Arkanoid vs. Space Invaders is missing most of the red flags people wave when dismissing the mobile marketplace. It isn’t the best version of Space Invaders out there but it is the best version of Arkanoid currently available".

Notes

References

2017 video games
Action video games
Android (operating system) games
Breakout clones
Crossover video games
IOS games
Multiplayer video games
Fiction about robots
Video games about robots
Science fiction video games
Space opera video games
Square Enix games
Taito games
Video games featuring female protagonists
Video games set in the future
Video games set in outer space
Video games developed in Japan